Skin is an 11-minute short film directed by Vincent O'Connell and starring Ewen Bremner and Marcia Rose. Produced by Tapson/Steel Films for British Screen and Channel 4 Films (now Film4 Productions), it was filmed in September 1995. The screenplay was written in the summer of that year by British playwright Sarah Kane.

It was first screened at the London Film Festival in October 1995, and was later given its television debut on Channel 4 at 11.35pm on 17 June 1997. An original airtime of 9.40pm was pushed back after television executives became worried about the depiction of violence and racism in the film, Vincent O'Connell was nominated for a Golden Bear award in the category "Best Short Film" for the film at the 1996 Berlin International Film Festival.

The film's screenplay was only Kane's second work, written after her 1995 debut Blasted but before 1996's Phaedra's Love. The screenplay appears in the complete collection of Sarah Kane's work, Sarah Kane: Complete Plays, published in 2001 by Methuen.

Bremner and Rose, who had never met prior to making the film, became romantically involved during its shooting, and subsequently had a child together.

Plot
Billy, a young skinhead, joins in a racist attack on a Black wedding party in Brixton, London, but then finds himself drawn to Marcia, a Black woman whose flat is visible from his window. He visits Marcia and the couple have sex. From this point, the power dynamic between the two begins to reverse: in separate scenes, she slaps his face repeatedly as he is tied to the bed, feeds him dog food, and scrubs off his tattoos with bleach, including one of the Union Flag. Finally, Marcia carves her name on Billy's back. Despite his pleas, she rejects him, finding solace with Kath, her flatmate, while Billy unsuccessfully attempts to overdose on drugs and is saved by Neville, a black man living in the same apartment building as him.

Cast
 Ewen Bremner as Billy
 Marcia Rose as Marcia
 Agnieszka Liggett as Kath
 Yemi Ajibade as Neville
 Dave Atkins as Mother
  James Bannon as Terry
  Dominic Brunt as Martin
 Gregory Donaldson as Nick

References

External links
 The film at Film4
 The film at Daily Motion
 
 Director's website

1995 films
1995 short films
British drama short films
Plays by Sarah Kane
Skinhead films
1990s gang films
1990s English-language films